Octopus chierchiae, commonly known as the lesser Pacific striped octopus or pygmy zebra octopus, is a species of octopus.

It has been proposed as a model organism for cephalopod research as it is one of the few octopus species with the ability to lay multiple egg clutches (iteroparity), compared to most octopus species that are semelparous and die after one reproductive event. This makes Octopus chierchiae a candidate for sustainable and multigenerational laboratory research.

Description 
Octopus chierchiae is a small octopus found in the central Pacific coast of the Americas, most often in Central America but sightings have been reported as far north as the Gulf of California. It lives in low, intertidal zones at a maximum depth of 40 meters. The largest mantle length recorded for Octopus chierchiae was 25 millimeters. Newly hatched Octopus chierchiae are 3.5 mm in length and reach adult size in 250 to 300 days. This is advantageous for research purposes, as other model octopus species (Octopus bimaculoides, Octopus maya, and Octopus vulgaris) can be three to ten times larger. They can be identified by the black and white striped pattern, which allows for non-invasive identification that might increase stress in a laboratory setting.

Males and females are both sexually and behaviorally dimorphic. Males exhibit an arm-twirling behavior by rapidly shaking the tips of their arms, termed as 'tasseling'. Additionally, males do not have suckers on the tip of their third right arm and instead have a hectocotylus, a sex organ that passes spermatophores to the female during mating. Octopus chierchiae reach sexual maturity around 6 months of age and can lay multiple clutches of eggs, approximately every 30 to 90 days.

Octopus chierchiae is closely related to the Larger Pacific striped octopus (LPSO), the only known social species of octopus that exhibits beak-to-beak mating and den-sharing among mated pairs. Octopus chierchiae is not known to exhibit any of these behaviors. However the egg development progression of Octopus chierchiae is similar to that of the LPSO.

See also
Larger Pacific striped octopus, a social species of octopus. These organisms are usually found near low intertidal zones, approximately 40 meters from the Gulf of California to Colombia.

References

External links

Octopodidae
Molluscs described in 1889